Colin J. McDonald (born September 30, 1984) is an American former professional ice hockey player. He last played for the Bridgeport Sound Tigers of the American Hockey League (AHL).  He was selected by the Edmonton Oilers in the second round, 51st overall, of the 2003 NHL Entry Draft. He played only two games with the team before signing with the Pittsburgh Penguins for the 2011–12 season. His time with the Penguins was also short-lived, as he proceeded to sign with the Islanders the following season. He is the son of Gerry McDonald, a former NHL player, who played for the Hartford Whalers. On February 28, 2021, McDonald announced his retirement from playing hockey at the age of 36.

Playing career

Amateur career
McDonald began his career playing for the New England Junior Coyotes of the Eastern Junior Hockey League (EJHL) during the 2002–03 season, where he led the league in scoring with 58 points (28 goals, 30 assists) and was named "Junior Coyote of the Year", and received the "EJHL Offensive Player of the Year Award" and League MVP.  He was selected MVP of the Top Prospects Tournament in 2002, as well as "Hockey Night In Boston Junior Player of the Year". He was also chosen to the U.S. National Junior Team Evaluation Camp in August 2003.

After being selected 51st overall in the National Hockey League's (NHL) 2003 draft by the Edmonton Oilers, McDonald spent four seasons with Providence College.  During his freshman year (2003–04), McDonald led Providence Friar freshmen with 10 goals. His performance earned him Providence's "Most Valuable Freshman" Award as well as a selection to the Hockey East All-Rookie Team. As a sophomore, McDonald missed time due to injury but still managed to match his point total from freshman year as he tallied up 11 goals and added 5 assists. As a junior, he served as an alternate captain and reached career highs in points (28) and assists (19), finishing fourth on his team in scoring. He was then named co-captain for the 2006-07 season at the end of the year. In his senior year he had a career high of 13 goals, along with 4 assists, totaling 17 points.

Professional career

McDonald joined the Edmonton Oilers organization in 2007 and was assigned to their minor league affiliate, the American Hockey League's (AHL) Springfield Falcons. He played 73 games in his first season, scoring 12 goals and 11 assists for 23 points. The following season, McDonald played 77 games, scoring 10 goals and 12 assists for 22 points and also played 3 games in the ECHL for the Stockton Thunder. He was first called up to the Oilers on November 26, 2009. He played in his first career NHL game the next night against the San Jose Sharks. His first NHL goal came in his second game on November 28, 2009 against Roberto Luongo of the Vancouver Canucks.

On July 1, 2011, McDonald was signed by the Pittsburgh Penguins to a one-year, $525,000 contract. In the 2011–12 season, he was primarily assigned to the Penguins' AHL affiliate, the Wilkes-Barre/Scranton Penguins, but was recalled to play in five games with the Penguins.

On July 2, 2012, McDonald signed as a free agent to a one-year, two-way contract with the New York Islanders. During the season, on March 15, 2013, he agreed to a two-year, one-way contract extension. He played most of the season on a line with Matt Martin and Casey Cizikas. In the 2013 playoffs against his former Penguins team, he played on a line with Michael Grabner and Keith Aucoin, scoring two goals and one assist as the Islanders were defeated in six games.

Early on in the 2014–15 season, on October 22, 2014, McDonald was placed on waivers; upon clearing he was assigned to the Islanders' AHL affiliate, the Bridgeport Sound Tigers, where he was named captain.

On July 3, 2015, having left the Islanders as a free agent, McDonald signed a one-year, two-way contract with the Philadelphia Flyers.

On June 19, 2018, McDonald signed a one-year AHL contract to remain with the Flyers AHL affiliate, the Lehigh Valley Phantoms.

As a free agent from the Phantoms, McDonald opted to return to the Bridgeport Sound Tigers, signing a one-year AHL contract with the team on August 29, 2019.

On February 28, 2021, McDonald announced his retirement from playing hockey on his Instagram and currently works with Recorded Future in cybersecurity.

Career statistics

Regular season and playoffs

International

Awards and honors

References

External links

 

1984 births
Living people
American men's ice hockey right wingers
Bridgeport Sound Tigers players
Edmonton Oilers draft picks
Edmonton Oilers players
Ice hockey players from Connecticut
Lehigh Valley Phantoms players
New York Islanders players
Oklahoma City Barons players
People from Wethersfield, Connecticut
Philadelphia Flyers players
Pittsburgh Penguins players
Providence Friars men's ice hockey players
Springfield Falcons players
Stockton Thunder players
Wilkes-Barre/Scranton Penguins players